Joynal Abedin may refer to:

People 
 Joynal Abedin, also known as V.P. Joynal, Bangladesh Nationalist Party politician
 Joynal Abedin (politician, born 1954), Bangladesh Awami League politician and the former Member of Parliament of Meherpur-1
 Joynal Abedin Hazari, Bangladesh Awami League politician and a former member of Jatiya Sangsad

See also
 Zainul Abedin (1914–1976), Bengali painter
 Zayn al-Abidin (659–713), Imam in Shiʻi Islam 
 Zainul Abedin Museum, Bangladeshi museum
 Zainul Abdin Farroque (born 1949), Bangladesh Nationalist Party politician and former Member of Parliament